This is a list of '''listed buildings in Christianshavn, Copenhagen, Denmark.

List

References

External links
 Danish Agency of Culture

Listed buildings and structures in Christianshavn
Christianshavn